Marden is a surname. Notable people with the surname include:

 Adrienne Marden (1909–1978), American actress
 Albert Marden (born 1934), American mathematician
 Brice Marden (born 1938), American artist
 John Louis Marden (1919–1999), British businessman and philanthropist
 Dr John Marden (1855–1924), Australian headmaster, pioneer of women's education, and Presbyterian elder
 Luis Marden (1913–2003), American photographer and explorer for the National Geographic
 Orison Swett Marden (1848–1924), American writer
 Robert A. Marden (born 1927), American politician and attorney
 Thomas Marden (1866–1951), British major general